Libor Pimek and Byron Talbot were the defending champions, but lost in the second round to tournament winners Gustavo Kuerten and Fernando Meligeni.

Gustavo Kuerten and Fernando Meligeni won the title by defeating Donald Johnson and Francisco Montana 6–4, 6–4 in the final.

Seeds
All seeds received a bye to the second round.

Draw

Finals

Top half

Bottom half

References

External links
 Official results archive (ATP)
 Official results archive (ITF)

Doubles 1997
Mercedes Cup Doubles